The Apocryphon Tour was a worldwide concert tour by American heavy metal band The Sword, in promotion of the band's 2012 fourth studio album Apocryphon. Beginning on October 29, 2012 in the United States, it is currently scheduled for nine legs with 163 shows in total, visiting countries in North America, Europe and Australasia. The Apocryphon Tour is the band's first full concert tour without original drummer Trivett Wingo, who left early into the Warp Riders Tour, and is also the first with current drummer Santiago "Jimmy" Vela III, who replaced Kevin Fender in October 2011.

Background
The first dates confirmed for the Apocryphon Tour were the opening two legs in the United States between October and December 2012, which were announced on the band's official website on September 5, 2012 along with the European release information for Apocryphon. Support acts for the opening 37 shows were also confirmed: Gpysyhawk as the primary support act at all shows, Eagle Claw as the third band for the first 23 shows, and American Sharks for the last 14 shows. Plans of a European leg in early 2013 were also revealed, with the first dates officially confirmed by The Sword's European label Napalm Records later in September.

A third North America headline leg of the tour was announced in June 2013, and will take place throughout July and August.

Set lists

{{hidden
| headercss  = background: #ccccff; font-size: 100%; width: 100%;
| contentcss = text-align: left; font-size: 100%; width: 100%;
| header     = Set list #1
| content    = 
"The Veil of Isis"
"Hammer of Heaven"
"Tres Brujas"
"Maiden, Mother & Crone"
"The Horned Goddess"
"Cloak of Feathers"
"The Hidden Masters"
"Seven Sisters"
"Freya"
"To Take the Black"
"Eyes of the Stormwitch"
"Apocryphon"
"The Chronomancer I: Hubris"
Encore
"Barael's Blade"
"Winter's Wolves"
}}
{{hidden
| headercss  = background: #ccccff; font-size: 100%; width: 100%;
| contentcss = text-align: left; font-size: 100%; width: 100%;
| header     = Set list #4
| content    = 
"Apocryphon"
"Freya"
"Hammer of Heaven"
"Tres Brujas"
"To Take the Black"
"Cloak of Feathers"
"The Hidden Masters"
"Dying Earth"
"Maiden, Mother & Crone"
"Night City"
"Seven Sisters"
"Eyes of the Stormwitch"
"The Horned Goddess"
"The Veil of Isis"
Encore
"Barael's Blade"
"Winter's Wolves"
}}
{{hidden
| headercss  = background: #ccccff; font-size: 100%; width: 100%;
| contentcss = text-align: left; font-size: 100%; width: 100%;
| header     = Set list #7
| content    = 
"Apocryphon"
"Freya"
"Hammer of Heaven"
"Codex Corvidae"
"Tres Brujas"
"To Take the Black"
"Cloak of Feathers"
"The Hidden Masters"
"Dying Earth"
"Maiden, Mother & Crone"
"Execrator"
"Seven Sisters"
"The Horned Goddess"
"The Veil of Isis"
Encore
"Barael's Blade"
"Winter's Wolves"
}}
{{hidden
| headercss  = background: #ccccff; font-size: 100%; width: 100%;
| contentcss = text-align: left; font-size: 100%; width: 100%;
| header     = Set list #10
| content    = 
"Apocryphon"
"Freya"
"Hammer of Heaven"
"Codex Corvidae"
"Tres Brujas"
"To Take the Black"
"Cloak of Feathers"
"The Hidden Masters"
"Dying Earth"
"Maiden, Mother & Crone"
"Arrows in the Dark"
"Seven Sisters"
"The Horned Goddess"
"The Veil of Isis"
Encore
"Cheap Sunglasses" (ZZ Top cover)
"Ebethron"
}}
{{hidden
| headercss  = background: #ccccff; font-size: 100%; width: 100%;
| contentcss = text-align: left; font-size: 100%; width: 100%;
| header     = Set list #13
| content    = 
"Apocryphon"
"Freya"
"Hammer of Heaven"
"Codex Corvidae"
"Tres Brujas"
"To Take the Black"
"Cloak of Feathers"
"The Hidden Masters"
"Dying Earth"
"Maiden, Mother & Crone"
"The Horned Goddess"
"Seven Sisters"
"Night City"
"The Veil of Isis"
Encore
"Barael's Blade"
"Cheap Sunglasses" (ZZ Top cover)
"Winter's Wolves"
}}
{{hidden
| headercss  = background: #ccccff; font-size: 100%; width: 100%;
| contentcss = text-align: left; font-size: 100%; width: 100%;
| header     = Set list #16
| content    = 
"Apocryphon"
"Freya"
"Hammer of Heaven"
"How Heavy This Axe"
"Tres Brujas"
"Cloak of Feathers"
"Dying Earth"
"Execrator"
"Maiden, Mother & Crone"
"To Take the Black"
"Seven Sisters"
"Eyes of the Stormwitch"
"Arrows in the Dark"
"The Veil of Isis"
Encore
"Winter's Wolves"
"Barael's Blade"
"Iron Swan"
}}
{{hidden
| headercss  = background: #ccccff; font-size: 100%; width: 100%;
| contentcss = text-align: left; font-size: 100%; width: 100%;
| header     = Set list #19
| content    = 
"The Veil of Isis"
"Freya"
"Hammer of Heaven"
"Tres Brujas"
"How Heavy This Axe"
"Cloak of Feathers"
"Arcane Montane"
"Dying Earth"
"Maiden, Mother & Crone"
"To Take the Black"
"Seven Sisters"
"Arrows in the Dark"
"Night City"
"Apocryphon"
Encore
"Barael's Blade"
"Winter's Wolves"
}}
{{hidden
| headercss  = background: #ccccff; font-size: 100%; width: 100%;
| contentcss = text-align: left; font-size: 100%; width: 100%;
| header     = Set list #22
| content    = 
"Apocryphon"
"How Heavy This Axe"
"Tres Brujas"
"Cloak of Feathers"
"Arcane Montane"
"Dying Earth"
"Maiden, Mother & Crone"
"To Take the Black"
"Hammer of Heaven"
"Freya"
"Seven Sisters"
"Eyes of the Stormwitch"
"Arrows in the Dark"
"The Veil of Isis"
Encore
"Iron Swan"
}}
{{hidden
| headercss  = background: #ccccff; font-size: 100%; width: 100%;
| contentcss = text-align: left; font-size: 100%; width: 100%;
| header     = Set list #25
| content    = 
"Apocryphon"
"Tres Brujas"
"How Heavy This Axe"
"Cloak of Feathers"
"Arcane Montane"
"Dying Earth"
"Freya"
"To Take the Black"
"Maiden, Mother & Crone"
"Execrator"
"Seven Sisters"
"Night City"
"Arrows in the Dark"
"Eyes of the Stormwitch"
"The Veil of Isis"
Encore
"Cheap Sunglasses" (ZZ Top cover)
"Winter's Wolves"
}}

{{hidden
| headercss  = background: #ccccff; font-size: 100%; width: 100%;
| contentcss = text-align: left; font-size: 100%; width: 100%;
| header     = Set list #2
| content    = 
"The Veil of Isis"
"Fire Lances of the Ancient Hyperzephyrians"
"Hammer of Heaven"
"Barael's Blade"
"Maiden, Mother & Crone"
"How Heavy This Axe"
"Cloak of Feathers"
"The Hidden Masters"
"Execrator"
"Freya"
"To Take the Black"
"Tres Brujas"
"Apocryphon"
"The Chronomancer I: Hubris"
Encore
"Eyes of the Stormwitch"
"Winter's Wolves"
}}
{{hidden
| headercss  = background: #ccccff; font-size: 100%; width: 100%;
| contentcss = text-align: left; font-size: 100%; width: 100%;
| header     = Set list #5
| content    = 
"Apocryphon"
"Freya"
"Hammer of Heaven"
"Codex Corvidae"
"Tres Brujas"
"To Take the Black"
"The Hidden Masters"
"Dying Earth"
"Execrator"
"Maiden, Mother & Crone"
"The Horned Goddess"
"Seven Sisters"
"The Veil of Isis"
"Lament for the Aurochs"
Encore
"Barael's Blade"
"Winter's Wolves"
}}
{{hidden
| headercss  = background: #ccccff; font-size: 100%; width: 100%;
| contentcss = text-align: left; font-size: 100%; width: 100%;
| header     = Set list #8
| content    = 
"Apocryphon"
"Freya"
"Hammer of Heaven"
"Codex Corvidae"
"Tres Brujas"
"To Take the Black"
"Cloak of Feathers"
"The Hidden Masters"
"Dying Earth"
"Maiden, Mother & Crone"
"Seven Sisters"
"The Horned Goddess"
"The Veil of Isis"
Encore
"Barael's Blade"
"Winter's Wolves"
}}

Tour dates

Personnel
J. D. Cronise – vocals, guitar
Kyle Shutt – guitar
Bryan Richie – bass
Santiago "Jimmy" Vela III – drums

References

2012 concert tours
2013 concert tours
The Sword concert tours